The Tungna (Nepali: टुङ्ना) is a plucked string instrument from the Northern Himalayan region: Nepal, Tibet, Sikkim and Bhutan. It is made from a single piece of carved wood. The front hollow body (which serves as the sound-box) is covered with stretched animal skin on which the 'bridge' sits. The Tungna has four strings which is anchored to the keys and body at both ends and the 'bridge' acts as a cantilever thus maintaining the tension of the strings.

It is mostly played by the people in the Himalayan Kingdom of Nepal mainly by the Tamang, Sherpa and Gurung people during auspicious occasions, gatherings and festivals. The musicians play the Tungna and sing songs, which they compose themselves especially to welcome the New Year or during the harvest season. Most households of this mountain region have at least one Tungna in their house.

See also 

Navneet Aditya Waiba
Music of Nepal
Dramyin
Arbajo

References

External links
Kutumba Instruments
Tungana at Atlas of Plucked String Instruments
Art tribal de l'Himalaya at Sanza.Skynetblogs.be 

Stringed instruments of Nepal
String instruments
Drumhead lutes
Tamang culture